Mansfield Hosiery Mills Cricket Club is an English cricket club based in Sutton-in-Ashfield, Nottinghamshire. The club competes in the Nottinghamshire Cricket Board Premier League, which is an accredited ECB Premier League, gaining promotion to the league in 2004.

Like most Premier League clubs, Mansfield have employed numerous overseas and English professional cricketers. During 2006 this was Francois du Plessis, the South Africa T20I captain and Test and ODI player, and in 2017 Australian cricketer Dylan Barmby. Current club professional is former Leicestershire player Tom New.

2010 season review

The close season of 2009 saw the departure of club professional Hassan Adnan from the Millers with Hassan moving to more familiar surroundings in the Derbyshire League with Alvaston and Boulton. His replacement was Paul Burdett who would join the club from Killamarsh to join youngster Gareth Curtis opening the batting who had impressed towards the end of the previous campaign, he was also joined at the club by Steven Ludlam from Killamarsh and would prove a huge addition to the Millers bowling attack particularly shining in important moments for the club. 2009 player of the year Matt New returned for the start of the campaign after a winter spent in Australia plus first team promotions for Mark Smallwood and Adam Dobb on a more regular basis gave the side a youthful look skippered again by Keshara Jayasinghe. The Mills season would begin with a home Derbyshire cup fixture against Sandiacre Town CC after a humbling 9 wicket defeat to the Derbyshire side in the previous campaign the Millers were determined to show what they were capable of enjoying a comprehensive 158 run win with Professional Paul Burdett enjoying a dream debut scoring 143 built around an explosive innings of 93 by Sudesh Fernando. Early league form was much more unpredictable wins against the Notts Academy and Wollaton were spoiled by games in which the side threw away against Kimberley Institute and Caythorpe. The Derbyshire cup quickly began to look like a competitor the Millers could be competitive in and followed the comprehensive win over Sandiacre with a more convincing 187 run win over Alvaston and Boulton with Youngster Gareth Curtis and Matt New striking 76 and 84 runs respectively in the Mills score of 271 before dismissing Alvaston for 84. Early success in the ECB national cup was also provided early season against Wickersley Old Village with 16-year-old Adam Dobb showing considerable character and no little skill bowling 8 overs at the end of the innings to secure the Mills a place in the next round. Progress in the Derbyshire Cup was secured after a rain affected match against Ilkeston and Rutland gave the Mills the needed point to progress, although those wondering what the result may have been in this clash did not need to wait too much longer. The lingering threat of relegation was a slight possibility for the Millers but those fears were eased with an away victory over Attenborough with Mark Smallwood stepping up to deliver with 56 to see the Mills to a 4 wicket victory with 23 balls to spare. This was backed up with an impressive double of the Notts Academy with Sudesh Fernando scoring a magnificent hundred to build on the opening stand by Curtis and Burdett of 80 at a run a ball and impressive death bowling by Steven Ludlam and Captain Keshara Jayasinghe clinching all 20 points for the Millers. Runaway Derbyshire Premier League leaders Lullington Park visited The Fieldings for the Derbyshire cup final in a game where the Mills were firm second favourites to the Derbyshire side, Opener Gareth Curtis took the attack to the bowlers with 78 at better than a run a ball supported by a patient 53 from Paul Burdett in bowler friendly conditions the Mills posted a competitive 220. At 103-4 Lullingtons reply was underway and the game in the balance 3 wickets for only 5 runs turned the match and the Mills progressed through to the semi finals winning by a 46 run margin where they would take on Spondon. Although wins were still proving tough to come by in the league the Mills picked up vital points with away wins over Wollaton and Radcliffe with Kyle Garside showing his worth with a 5 wicket haul and vital losing draw points at home to champions elect Clifton. As it had looked likely the season would depend on success in the Derbyshire Cup after being eliminated from both the National cup and the Twenty 20 without much fuss. The semi final with Spondon was to prove problematic with both Dobb and James Fraser being ruled out through injury and being replaced by Craig Scholes and Mills veteran Darren Johnson, Spondon were to bat first and appeared to be crushing to the final after reached 95-0 in rapid time with former Derbyshire player Ben Ashdown leading the assault but regular wickets allowed the Mills to restrict them to a par total of 232 well reachable for a place in the final. The Mills reply started off well but regular wickets left the team at 67-3 and in big trouble of capitulating, however the team seemed to have more strength in this competition than in the league and Gareth Curtis and Sudesh Fernando added 96 for the 4th wicket for Fernando at his best hitting 64 during the partnership with Curtis just occupying the crease allowing Fernando to dominate. When Curtis departed for 59 it allowed the captain Jayashinghe and Johnson to both hit key innings with Johnson in particular scoring 21 off 15 balls with Fernando departing for 89 the game my have swung back to Spondon but Ludlam showed his all round ability to deliver under pressure and saw the team home and helping the Mills progress to the Derbyshire Cup final where they would meet Ilkeston and Rutland. Premier League status was secured with a comprehensive 8 wicket victory over Neighbours Welbeck with ex Nottinghamshire and Midlands player Craig Gould impressing with a fast bowling 5 wicket haul as the Mills dismissed the hosts for only 91. The most interesting thing about the Derbyshire cup final day was the selection headache facing captain Jayasinghe as late as 5 minutes before the toss, the availability of talisman fast bowler Kieran Garside meant that someone would have to miss out on selection, it came down to a straight decision between Scholes and Fraser with Fraser being given the nod over the unlucky Scholes who had performed well during the campaign. Captain Jayasinghe won the toss and chose to bowl with Ilkestons main threat being provided by Derbyshire opener Chesney Hughes and Ilkeston captain and the competition's leading run scorer David Smit. The Mills could not have predicted it could go so well with Garside providing his worth dismissing Hughes thanks to an incredible catch by Ludlam, Ludlam would then himself come into the attack to contribute figures of 9-2-19-4 showing once again his ability to perform under pressure. A simple run chase however this was never going to be as Mills were rocked at 40-4 and then 68-5. The bright light being the incredible composure shown by Mark Smallwood occupying the crease waiting for a willing partner he found one in Fraser who decided to play the way he knows how hitting two giant sixes into grandstand to send the team into hysterics and secure the trophy for the Mills. Steve Ludlam was righty awarded man of the match for his brilliant display of bowling with the trophy rounding of an exciting season for a young side playing in a very competitive standard. Steve Ludlam was also voted player of the season.

2011 season review

The Mills were to go into the 2011 season with high optimism that they could improve on last season's league position and defend the Derbyshire Cup. However the close season departure of Gareth Curtis to champions Clifton would leave a gap at the top of the order with Youngster Rob Townsend promoted from within to fill Curtis shoes at the top of the order. Lewis Saxby arrived to improve the depth in the bowling department although Adam Dobb would be unavailable in league matches due to Notts Academy commitments but would continue to perform in Cup competitions. On the eve of the new season Curtis would however returns to the Mills having been unable to secure a place in the Clifton side he returned to the Mills to compete with new openers Smallwood and Townsend. Smallwood and Townsend staked their intentions for the opening slot with a 50 opening stand away at Kimberley in a disappointing but in terms of points gained acceptable opening day performance. Curtis would return to the side following his transfer at home to Papplewick with Townsend unavailable he would slot in to the opening spot and returned in style scoring 103 his maiden premier league hundred as the Mills chased down a score in excess of 250 to record a key win. The young Millers would welcome back Professional Paul Burdett for the trip to champions Clifton but after a promising start in which the Mills reduced Cliftons powerful batting line up to 86-4 former Derbyshire professional Tom Lungley and Richard Harris steadied the ship with the latter hitting a brilliant 107, In reply on Curtis and Fraser managed to come to terms with the powerful bowling attack and the Mills succumbed to a heavy defeat. The disappointment was short lived as the Mills won a close national cup game the next day against Elsecar with Gareth Curtis hitting 88 the Mills posted 183 which would prove 30 too many for Elsecar as 3 wickets for Steve Ludlam ensured victory for the Millers. Disappointing league performances against the West Indian Cavaliers and Nottinghamshire Academy although James Fraser showed his undoubted potential in the Academy game hitting a brilliant 74* not out to give the Mills full batting points. These results were surrounded by both Derbyshire Cup and National Cup matches the first being an incredible game against Chesterfield at Queens Park, the Mills posted a par score of 225 slightly disappointing after being 79-0 and 110-1, Matt New returned to form with 71 and Curtis fell one short of his half century with 49 and a quick fire 38 off just 27 balls from captain Jayasinghe gave the Mills some momentum going into the field. The Mills bowlers showed excellent control but struggled to dominate the match on what was a very good batting strip and with 4 needed from 4 balls the batsmen struck it out to long off where Matt New ran and retrieved the ball but unfortunately slipped on the wet outfield and it was clear from his screams that it was a bad injury later reported to be a broken leg and he would miss 4 months action. The Chesterfield batsmen decided they would run regardless of the injury and the umpire decided to award them 3 runs much to the amusement of the Millers, with 1 run needed from 3 balls Ludlam faced an impossible task, whatever fate was looking over the Mills following News injury is not clear but something was at work that day as Ludlam bowled the final 3 balls for 0 runs ensuring a tie when the match seemed certain for defeat. The national cup match saw a trip down the A1 to Doncaster with Paul Burdett showing he was returning to form with a brilliant 127* not out supported by 47 from Dobb and 65* not out from Fraser who was really maturing as a batsman in this campaign. In the reply Steve Ludlams 4 wickets ensured the Mills would again progress to the third round of the National cup. With the cup runs over for the time being the Mills recorded two vital league wins over Cuckeny firstly where an all round team batting performance saw the Mills chase 251 for victory with Burdett scoring 78 and Fernando seeing the team home alongside Fraser with 63 and 39 respectively. A potential relegation all battle with Kiveton Park resulted in a comfortable winning draw for the Millers with Gareth Curtis hitting his second hundred of the season 111* not out and a cameo from Steve Ludlam at the end of 47* not out seeing the Mills posted 287 with Kiveton struggling to reach the total they secured Losing draw points with Fernando taking 3 wickets for the Mills. The Mills returned to cup action with a trip to Hyde CC for the third round of the National cup to be played on a soaking wet wicket with the home side batting very well to post 226 helped by the wicket beginning to dry out during the day in reply the Mills were progressing steadily with Curtis and Jayasinghe already putting 50 on for the third wicket and the score 77-2 when 3 run outs in the space of 30 minutes decimated the innings with Curtis departing for 49 and Jayasinghe 30 a match in which the Mills can take as much blame as Hyde could take credit for the exit from the cup. Even more disappointing was the exit from the Derbyshire Cup as a rained off match at Home to Lullington Park saw the Mills eliminated despite being undefeated in their defence of the competition. The team got back to winning ways a home to Belvoir who boasted former Nottinghamshire Opening batsmen Darren Bicknell in their ranks, the Mills knew this was a must win game and posted a massive 297 with Curis and Fernando adding 131 for the third wicket Curtis departing for his third ton of the season with 141 and Fernando with 81, 3 wickets for Keshara Jayasinghe ensured the points would go the Mills with a comfortable winning draw secured and relegation fears eased. The Mills would rack up 290 again in the league this time away at Papplewick with Fernando batting expertly to score 124* not out of just 107 deliveries with captain Jayasinghe striking 36 and Fraser adding a cameo of 22, Fernando would also weight in with 3 wickets to ensure the points went the way of the Millers. The Mills continued their liking for playing the Notts Academy with a winning draw at home when defeat seemed inevitable the Mills had posted a mammoth 293-7 with Curtis, Fernando and Jaysinghe all scoring half centuries however at 200-2 with Hassan Azad and Oliver Swann batting beautifully the Academy were cruising, Captain Jayasinghe decided to turn to part-time spinner Robert Townsend who turned the game on its head with the incredible figures of 7-2-13-6 with the Academy falling 60 runs short and Townsend ensuring heroic status amongst his teammates. Survival was again secured with an away victory at Kiveton Park with Curtis hitting his 4th hundred of the season and half century's from Burdett and Fernando ensured a total beyond Kivetons reach, Fernando would also claim a 5 wicket haul showing his all round talents. The highlight of the season for the team had to be the home match against Caythorpe where Kieran Garside after a tough season struggling through lack of form finally returned to his very best taking 8 wickets for 27 runs in a truly incredible spell of bowling clean bowling 5 of his victims much to the delight of his teammates who had been desperate to see their teammate perform like he could. A season which saw no silverware but with young talent progressing through the ranks indeed young Joe New hit the youngest 50 ever in the Notts premier league aged just 13 in the home defeat to Welbeck showing the future would be bright with the club sticking by young talent. Player of the season was Gareth Curtis

2012 season review
The winter months of 2011 were a busy time for the Mills management with much comings and goings to the side from the previous campaign. The marquee signing was Tom New rejoining the club following his release from Leicestershire and he would join the side as Batsmen wicket keeper, Adam Dobb was also to rejoin the club following his release from the Notts Academy and would form a key spin trio with Matt New and Sudesh Fernando. Unfortunately the team said goodbye to Paul Burdett and Steve Ludlam two guys who had fitted in extremely well to the club and been key parts of the cup success enjoyed by the Mills over the previous campaigns, Mark Smallwood also said goodbye deciding that opportunities would be easier to come by at Worksop and made the move to the Bassetlaw side. Perhaps the biggest disappointment was the departure of Kieran Garside to Cuckney, the fast bowler had really found his form towards the end of the campaign and his loss was a real blow to the Mills ambitions. Jonathan Salmon and Billy North were promoted to the first team squad to cover the gap left by Garside later filled by Ashley Holland who was to join the club during the campaign. The season began with a trip to Cuckney with the game being played on a wicket clearly affected by the weather but the willingness of both sides ensured a match was played with Cuckney bowling a depleted Mills line up out for under 50 to give the season an early knock back. The team bounced back winning away at Wollaton with Tom New and Sudesh Fernando both scoring half century's and 6 wickets for Matt New put the mills back on track. An exciting National cup tie at home to Whitley Hall followed with Craig Gould in outstanding form striking 174* not out in the Mills 271 however Whitley Hall batted with incredible intent and knocked the Mills score off with 5 overs to spare, a remarkable run chase but the Mills should have scored more runs on what was a very good wicket.

English club cricket teams
Cricket in Nottinghamshire